The Loknayak Express is an Express train belonging to North Eastern Railway zone that runs between  and  in India. It is currently being operated with 15115/15116 train numbers on a weekly basis.

This train is named after Jayaprakash Narayan, a freedom fighter & political leader who remembered especially for leading the mid-1970s opposition against Prime Minister Indira Gandhi, for whose overthrow he called a "total revolution". Lok Nayak means The People's Hero.

Service

The 15115/Loknayak Express has an average speed of 41 km/hr and covers 1000 km in 24h 40m. The 15116/Loknayak Express has an average speed of 43 km/hr and covers 1000 km in 23h 20m.

Route and halts 

The important halts of the train are:

 
 
 
 
  
 
 
 
 
 
 
 
 
 
 
 
 Old

Coach composition

The train has standard ICF rakes with a max speed of 110 kmph. The train consists of 17 coaches:

 1 AC II Tier
 2 AC III Tier
 6 Sleeper coaches
 6 General Unreserved
 2 Seating cum Luggage Rake

Traction

Both trains are hauled by a Gonda Loco Shed-based WDM-3A diesel locomotive from Chhapra to Old Delhi and vice versa.

Direction reversal

The train reverses its direction 1 times:

See also 

 Chhapra Junction railway station
 Old Delhi railway station
 Mahamana Express
 Lokmanya Express

Notes

References

External links 

 15115/Loknayak Express India Rail Info
 15116/Loknayak Express India Rail Info

Transport in Chhapra
Transport in Delhi
Named passenger trains of India
Rail transport in Uttar Pradesh
Rail transport in Delhi
Rail transport in Bihar
Railway services introduced in 2014
Memorials to Jayaprakash Narayan
Express trains in India